Demaria may refer to:

Demaria (surname), surname
Mount Demaria, mountain on the west coast of Kyiv Peninsula in Graham Land, Antarctica

See also 

 De Maria